is an inclined Neptune trojan leading Neptune's orbit in the outer Solar System, approximately 80 kilometers in diameter. It was first observed on 7 October 2005, by American astronomers Scott Sheppard and Chad Trujillo at Las Campanas Observatory in the Atacama desert of Chile. It was the third such body to be discovered, and the first with a significant orbital inclination, which showed that the population as a whole is very dynamically excited.

Orbit and classification 
Neptune trojans are resonant trans-Neptunian objects (TNO) in a 1:1 mean-motion orbital resonance with Neptune. These Trojans have a semi-major axis and an orbital period very similar to Neptune's (30.10 AU; 164.8 years).

 belongs to the larger  group, which leads 60° ahead Neptune's orbit. It orbits the Sun with a semi-major axis of 30.014 AU at a distance of 28.1–31.9 AU once every 164 years and 5 months (60,059 days). Its orbit has an eccentricity of 0.06 and an inclination of 25° with respect to the ecliptic.

It has the same orbital period as Neptune and orbits at the  Lagrangian point about 60° ahead of Neptune. It has an inclination of 25 degrees.

Physical characteristics

Diameter 
The discoverers estimate that  has a mean-diameter of 80 kilometers based on a magnitude of 23.7. Based on a generic magnitude-to-diameter conversion, it measures approximately 68 kilometers in diameter using an absolute magnitude of 9.0 and an assumed albedo of 0.10.

Numbering and naming 
Due to its orbital uncertainty, this minor planet has not been numbered and its official discoverers have not been determined. If named, it will follow the naming scheme already established with 385571 Otrera, which is to name these objects after figures related to the Amazons, an all-female warrior tribe that fought in the Trojan War on the side of the Trojans against the Greek.

References

External links 
 Three New "Trojan" Asteroids Found Sharing Neptune's Orbit by Scott S. Sheppard (includes image of )
  
 AstDys-2 about 
 
 

Minor planet object articles (unnumbered)

20051007